Peripsocus milleri is a species of Psocoptera from the Peripsocidae family that can be found in Great Britain and Ireland. They can also be found on Azores and Canary Islands, Belgium, Croatia, France, Italy, and Spain. The species are brown coloured.

Habitat 
The species feed om oaks.

References 

Peripsocidae
Insects described in 1923
Psocoptera of Europe
Taxa named by Robert John Tillyard